Megan Oldham (born 12 May 2001) is a Canadian freestyle skier who competes internationally in the big air and slopestyle disciplines. Oldham grew up in Parry Sound, Ontario.

Career 
Oldham joined the Canadian national team in 2018. In January 2019, Oldham won her first FIS World Cup medal, a silver, in the slopestyle event. In March 2019, Oldham won her first World Cup gold and took home the 2019 Slopestyle Crystal Globe.

Oldham competed at her first World Championships in 2021. Oldham won the bronze medal in the slopestyle and fourth in the big air.

Oldham won two medals at the 2022 Winter X Games: a silver in big air and a bronze in the slopestyle. 

On January 24, 2022, Oldham was named to Canada's 2022 Olympic team in the big air and slopestyle events. She earned a fourth-place finish in Big Air. 

In January 2023, while competing in the X Games, Oldham became the first woman to land a triple cork in any women's ski or snowboard event. She landed a leftside triple cork 1440 while competing in Women’s Ski Big Air, and won a gold medal in that event. She won her second gold at the 2023 X Games in women's ski slopetyle.

References

External links 
 

2001 births
Living people
Canadian female freestyle skiers
Sportspeople from Newmarket, Ontario
Freestyle skiers at the 2022 Winter Olympics
Olympic freestyle skiers of Canada
X Games athletes